Schizophonic is the 1997 debut solo album from guitarist Nuno Bettencourt, the lead guitarist in the band Extreme. Bettencourt is credited on the cover simply as "Nuno". Schizophonic is Bettencourt's first and, so far, only solo effort after the group disbanded.

Overview
In face of the then-current musical trends, Bettencourt added an alternative rock edge to his style. Bettencourt wrote with producer Anthony J. Resta, known for his work with Duran Duran around their big comeback. The album features Restas' Enoesque soundscapes on many of the songs. Bettencourt later went on to record two records leading the band Mourning Widows, one with Population 1 (mostly recorded on his own) and then another with the same touring band but with a different name: Dramagods. Schizophonic'''s recording started over a stretch of time during Extreme's tour for their last studio album, Waiting for the Punchline''.

Bettencourt wrote most of the songs and played most of the instruments on the album, except for "You", on which vocals are shared with co-author and former bandmate Gary Cherone, drums on "Swollen Princess" and "Fine By Me" (Mike Mangini) and "Fallen Angels", and "Note in the Screen Door", "Karmalaa", and "Severed" which were written with Anthony J. Resta. The album cover featured Bettencourt dressed as a woman and with a prominent scar on his forehead.

Track listing 
All songs written by Bettencourt, except where noted.
 "Gravity" – 3:45
 "Swollen Princess" – 3:12
 "Crave" – 3:45
 "What you Want" – 3:31
 "Fallen Angels" (Bettencourt, Anthony J. Resta) – 4:00
 "2 Weeks In Dizkneelande" – 3:16
 "Pursuit Of Happiness" (Bettencourt, Gary Cherone) – 3:33
 "Fine By Me" – 3:42
 "Karmalaa" (Bettencourt, Resta) – 3:26
 "Confrontation" – 3:46
 "Note on The Screen Door" (Bettencourt, Resta) – 4:13
 "I Wonder" – 4:21
 "Got To Have You" – 4:53
 "You" (Bettencourt, Cherone) – 4:25
 "Severed" – (Bettencourt, Resta) – 4:06
 "Hop The Train" (Japanese Bonus Track)
 "Garbage" (Japanese Bonus Track)

Personnel
 Nuno Bettencourt – vocals, guitars, bass, drums
 Gary Cherone – vocals on track 14
 Mike Mangini - drums on tracks 2 and 8

References

A&M Records albums
1997 debut albums